Shane Jacobson (born 18 March 1970) is an Australian actor, director, writer, and comedian, best known as the "Dunny Man" for his performances as the eponymous character Kenny Smyth, a plumber working for a portable toilet rental company, in the 2006 film Kenny and the spin-off TV series, Kenny's World. In 2006, he won the Australian Film Institute's Award for Best Actor in a Leading Role for that performance. In 2017 and 2018 he presented Little Big Shots, on the Seven Network, based on the American series of the same title. In 2019, Jacobson became a judge on Australia's Got Talent.

Career
Jacobson began his career on the stage at the age of 10 with amateur theatre and the Melbourne Gang Show. At 18, he began his comedy career with regular theatre restaurant, musical theatre, stand-up and MC gigs. He was also hired to play to corporate functions, impersonating business icons and luminaries.

In 1999, Jacobson received a regular segment on Melbourne's Gold FM radio station, called The 60 Minute Challenge. He also created the character voice of Sergio the Hairdresser, who featured regularly on Gold FM's Breakfast Show. Jacobson's focus eventually moved towards the camera and he began acting in music videos, short films and television commercials whilst continuing to perform audience warm-ups for major TV networks.

In 2006, Jacobson starred in the Australian mockumentary film Kenny as Kenny Smyth, a Melbourne plumber who works for plumbing company Splashdown. The film was a critical and financial success, and is considered to be Jacobson's break-out role. In 2008, he reprised the role for Channel Ten's short-lived TV series Kenny's World.

In 2007, Jacobson filmed two Australian feature films Cactus, directed by Jasmine Yuen-Carrucan and released in cinemas in May, and Newcastle, directed by Dan Castle and released later in 2008.

In April 2008, he began his role of Nicely-Nicely Johnson in the major stage production Guys and Dolls. For this role, he won a 2008 Helpmann Award for "Best Supporting Actor in a Musical".

On 24 April 2009, Jacobson guest co-hosted Australian television program The Morning Show with Kylie Gillies, while the program's regular male co-host Larry Emdur was on holidays.

In 2009, Jacobson co-starred with Paul Hogan in Charlie & Boots, an Australian film in which Boots (Jacobson) takes his father, Charlie (Hogan) on a road trip to fish on the northernmost tip of Australia because of something his father told him they would do one day, when he was a kid. It had the best opening weekend for any Australian film in 2009 when it was released on Father's day. The film was shot on location and features many small towns in country Australia.

Jacobson was co-host of the short lived car show Top Gear Australia with Steve Pizzati and Ewen Page which ran for two seasons from 28 September 2010 on Nine Network to 13 September 2011.

In June 2011, the Herald Sun revealed that Jacobson would be starring in the TV mini series Beaconsfield, the story of the Beaconsfield Mine collapse, playing the role of Brant Webb. It aired on Sunday 22 April 2012.

In 2013, Jacobson co-hosted the first season of The Great Australian Bake Off an Australian reality television baking competition.

Jacobson also starred as Luce Tivolli in the 2013 ABC drama The Time of Our Lives, which ran for two seasons (2013/2014).

In 2018, Jacobson joined the voice cast of Thomas & Friends, voicing an Australian steam engine called Shane.

In mid-2018 Jacobson hosted Little Big Shots Australia for Channel 7.

In 2019, Jacobson became a judge on Australia's Got Talent alongside Lucy Durack, Nicole Scherzinger and Manu Feildel.  In June 2022,
Jacobson was announced to be returning as a judge on Australia's Got Talent, alongside new judges Kate Ritchie, Alesha Dixon and David Walliams.

In 2020, Jacobson starred in the Australian comedy-drama film Never Too Late which had been filmed in Adelaide, South Australia the previous year.

In 2021, Jacobson was the narrator for the SBS documentary Inside Central Station.

In 2022 he produced and performed in a celebrity tribute to Australian comedian and actor Paul Hogan, Roast of Paul Hogan, which was broadcast on Australia’s Seven Network.

Scouting

During his youth, Jacobson was a Scout with 1st Keilor, 15th Essendon and Snowy Morcom Rover Crew. Jacobson credits Scouting shows, including Melbourne Gang Show and Bayside Showtime as first piquing his interest in the performing arts.

After two decades, Jacobson returned to Scouting in 2015, in a ceremonial position, as Scouts Victoria's Chief Scout. The position of Chief Scout of Victoria had been held previously by Governors of Victoria. The position was offered to Jacobson as a high-profile former Scout with the star power to promote Scouting to Victorian and wider audiences.

Filmography

Film

Television

Theatre

Bibliography

Awards
Jacobson has won several awards:

 2006 Australian Film Institute award for Best Actor in a Leading Role for Kenny
 2006 Film Critics Circle of Australia awards for Best Actor in a Lead Role and Best Screenplay for Kenny
 2006 Inside Film Award for both Best Feature Film and Best Script (shared with Clayton Jacobson)
 2007 Film Ink Magazine Awards for Best Newcomer
 2007 Australian Star of the Year Award at the Australian International Movie Convention.
 2008 Helpmann Award for Best Supporting Actor in a Musical, for his role as Nicely-Nicely Johnson in the stage production Guys and Dolls.

References

External links
 
 

Australian male film actors
Australian male television actors
Australian male voice actors
Helpmann Award winners
People from Essendon, Victoria
Living people
Best Actor AACTA Award winners
1970 births
Australian people of Finnish descent
Scouting and Guiding in Australia
Male actors from Melbourne